Kiddieland Amusement Park (stylized as "KiDDieLAND") was an amusement park located at the corner of North Avenue and First Avenue in Melrose Park, Illinois. It was home to several classic rides including the Little Dipper roller coaster, which opened in 1950. The park closed on September 27, 2009, and was demolished in 2010 to make way for a new Costco store. The sign for the amusement park was relocated to the Melrose Park Public Library, where it can be seen in the parking lot.

History
Kiddieland started out as a small venture of Arthur Fritz, a local builder and contractor, in 1929 when he purchased six ponies and offered rides to local children. He realized parents would often save a few pennies in order to provide their children entertainment during the Great Depression. Miniature gasoline-powered cars were added a few years later after Fritz learned that they were being given away to children by a Chicago newspaper as a subscription promotion. By the 1930s, Fritz was calling his collection of amusements Kiddieland; the attractions were primarily sized and geared towards younger children.

In 1940, the German Carousel, two miniature steam locomotives, the Little Auto Ride, the Roto Whip and the Ferris wheel were added. The Roto Whip and Ferris wheel would remain as rides until the park's closing. The park saw its first major expansion in the 1950s with the addition of the Little Dipper and the merry-go-round. Fritz's adult children also became more involved in the park at this time. The 1960s saw bumper cars replace the original pony ride, as well as the unexpected death of Fritz in 1967.

The park transferred ownership in 1977, as three of Fritz's grandchildren took over the park and its operation.

Closure 
A dispute developed between Shirley and Glenn Rynes, who owned the land that Kiddieland occupied, and Ronald Rynes, Jr. and Cathy and Tom Norini, who owned the amusement park itself. The landowners sued the park owners in 2004, claiming that the park had an improper insurance policy and that fireworks were prohibited in the lease. The case was thrown out in a Cook County court and later in an appeals court. The landowners declined to extend the lease on the land in early 2009. In late June 2010, it was announced that Kiddieland would be demolished, nine months after the park closed to the public. A Costco store now occupies the land.

Image gallery

Rides and Attractions

References

External links 

 Archived copy of official website, from 4/10/2008

Amusement parks in Illinois
1929 establishments in Illinois
2009 disestablishments in Illinois
Defunct amusement parks in the United States
Melrose Park, Illinois
Buildings and structures in Cook County, Illinois